The Lost Broadcasts is a Yes DVD released by Voiceprint in 2009. It contains footage of Yes from 1969 to 1971. In late August 2009, the "Time and a Word" video was posted on the internet as a preview, where the original title From a Time Beyond and Before was shown. About a week later, the clip was deleted and re-posted with the new title The Lost Broadcasts.

Track listing
1.No Opportunity Necessary, No Experience Needed - Beat-Club 1969
2.Looking Around - Beat Club 1969

3.Survival - Beat Club 1969
Previously unreleased
4. Time and a Word - Belgian TV 1970
This lip-synced performance was broadcast once in February 1970.
5.Yours Is No Disgrace - Beat Club 1971

6.All Good People (Take 1) - Beat Club 1971

7.All Good People (Take 2) - Beat Club 1971

8.All Good People (Take 3) - Beat Club 1971

Personnel
Jon Anderson - Vocals
Peter Banks - Guitar on tracks 1-4
Bill Bruford - Drums
Steve Howe - Guitar on tracks 5-8
Tony Kaye - Organ
Chris Squire - Bass

External links
http://www.yeslostbroadcastsdvd.com/
http://www.yesworld.com/gallery/thelostbroadcasts.html

Yes (band) video albums
2009 video albums
Yes (band) live albums
Live video albums
2009 live albums